Fingo may refer to:

 Fingo (charm), a Norwegian folk charm supposed to deter burglary
 FinGO (company), a mobile communications company
 Fingo fever, a disease of Victorian Australia
 Fingo (Mfengu), a tribe of South Africa
 Fingo (talisman), a protective charm of the Mijikenda people
 'Hypotheses non fingo', phrase coined by Isaac Newton